Cannabis in the United States Virgin Islands is legal for recreational use since January 18, 2023. Legislation to legalize was passed by the territorial legislature in 2022, and was signed into law on January 18. Medical use was legalized in 2019 through a bill that passed the Senate 9–4.

Decriminalization (2014)
In December 2014, USVI's unicameral Legislature voted 14–0 to override Governor John P. DeJongh's line-item veto of cannabis decriminalization from the territory's 2015 budget. Governor DeJohng had vetoed the measure in October, saying the bill would complicate the government's ability to deal with cannabis regarding workplace safety rules and pre-trial release and bail.

Medical cannabis referendum (2014)
In 2014 a non-binding referendum was held in USVI, asking voters whether the Legislature should explore the issue of legalizing medical cannabis. In August the USVI Senate approved the addition of that referendum to the 2014 election, 12–2. In November, the results were announced as coming in favor of the consideration of medical cannabis, 56%–43% (10,503–8,074). It followed a 2012 referendum that approved the legalisation of industrial hemp.

Medical cannabis legalized (2019)
On January 19, 2019, Gov. Albert Bryan signed into law the Virgin Islands Medical Cannabis Patient Care Act. A system for licensing of cultivators and dispensaries is also outlined, as well as a provision for patients to cultivate up to 12 plants. The act passed the Senate by a 9–4 vote.

Adult-use cannabis legislation (2019)
On December 3, 2019, Gov. Albert Bryan announced a recreational cannabis amendment to the Virgin Islands Medical Cannabis Patient Care Act. The amendment would allow anyone to obtain a license to purchase cannabis from a licensed dispensary. Expungement of non-violent marijuana convictions is included in the amendment.

Adult-use cannabis legislation (2022)
Senate Bill 34-0345 "to expand the legalization of Cannabis from medicinal use to include Adult Use Cannabis" was introduced by Senators Janelle K. Sarauw and Angel L. Bolques in November 2022. The bill was passed by a veto-proof Senate majority on December 30, 2022. The governor signed it into law on January 18.

Illicit economy
The July 2003 Puerto Rico and the U.S. Virgin Islands Drug Threat Assessment by the National Drug Intelligence Center describes the illicit economy around cannabis in the USVI:

Most marijuana available in the USVI arrives from southern island locations such as St. Lucia and St. Vincent and the Grenadines; however, its origin is unknown. ... Cannabis produced locally in the USVI usually is cultivated outdoors; however, poor terrain and arid climate across the USVI produce a low-quality product. ... Marijuana primarily is transported to the USVI in small maritime vessels. ... In the USVI local criminal groups and independent dealers are the primary wholesale and retail distributors of marijuana. ... Treatment data for the USVI are unavailable; however, USVI law enforcement officials indicate that marijuana abuse is widespread.
...

Typically, the marijuana available in the USVI is transported from islands in the Caribbean; the source of the marijuana is not known.... The DEA Caribbean Division reported the following marijuana seizures in the USVI: 0.3 kilograms in FY2000; 28.6 kilograms in FY2001, and 465.5 kilograms in FY2002. ... In St. Thomas and St. John, marijuana sold for approximately $1,300 per kilogram, $600 per pound, $100 per ounce, and $10 per bag in the second quarter of FY2002.
....

The percentage of drug-related federal sentences that were marijuana-related in Puerto Rico and the USVI in FY2001 was significantly lower than the national percentage. According to USSC data, 3.0 percent of drug-related federal sentences in Puerto Rico and 6.7 percent of drug-related federal sentences in the USVI were marijuana-related compared with 32.8 percent nationally.
...

The level of violence directly attributed to marijuana distribution in Puerto Rico and the USVI is low. However, distributors who sell marijuana often distribute other drugs, including cocaine and heroin, and commit violent crimes to protect their territory.
...

Cannabis also is cultivated--primarily outdoors--in the USVI; however, poor terrain and arid climate across the USVI produce a low quality product. Nearly all the cannabis cultivated is intended for local distribution. Cultivation sites most commonly are located in rural areas across the islands and typically contain 100 to 200 cannabis plants. In August 2002 federal and local law enforcement authorities seized approximately 1,100 cannabis plants in a series of raids in St. Croix. Law enforcement officials located the plants using helicopters. The plants were scattered in plots throughout the western half of the island. No arrests were made.
...

Most of the marijuana available in the USVI is transported by small maritime vessels from southern island locations including St. Lucia or St. Vincent and the Grenadines. Neither the principal transporters nor the origin of marijuana arriving in the USVI from these locations is known.
...

In the USVI local criminal groups and independent dealers are the primary wholesale- and retail-level distributors of marijuana. ... In the USVI marijuana is sold via hand-to-hand transactions on city streets and in residences, bars, and clubs.

References

Virgin Islands
Politics of the United States Virgin Islands
Society of the United States Virgin Islands
United States Virgin Islands